Eoin Sheriff (born 22 August 1988) in Gorey, Ireland is a former Irish professional rugby union player. He played at lock for Saracens. Sheriff came through the Leinster Academy system before moving to Saracens in 2011. He retired from the game due to injury at 27 years of age. Sheriff is currently Head Coach of  Wanderers F.C. He is also Forwards Coach for the Leinster u18 Clubs and at Presentation College Bray.

References

External links
Premiership Rugby Profile
European Professional Club Rugby Profile
Saracens Profile

Irish rugby union players
Saracens F.C. players
1988 births
Living people
Rugby union locks